The National Soccer Stadium is a football stadium located in Apia, Samoa. It is the national stadium of Samoa and the home of the Samoa national football team and the Samoa National League. It also was the venue for the 2012 OFC Nations Cup Qualification and different youth and women's football tournaments in Oceania.

Hosted Competitions 
2007 Pacific Games
2012 OFC Nations Cup Qualification
2014 FIFA World Cup OFC First Round qualification
2015 OFC U-17 Championship
2017 OFC U-17 Championship - First Round
2019 Pacific Games

Owning teams 
Samoa national rugby union team
Samoa women's national football team
Samoa national football team

See also 
Tuanaimato

References 

Buildings and structures in Apia
Football venues in Samoa
Samoa National League